Lucie Englisch (8 February 1902, in Baden bei Wien – 12 October 1965) was an Austrian actress.

She was married to the actor Heinrich Fuchs.

Selected filmography

 The Night Belongs to Us (1929)
 Three Days Confined to Barracks (1930)
 End of the Rainbow (1930)
 Rooms to Let (1930)
 The Widow's Ball (1930)
 The Rhineland Girl (1930)
 Two People (1930)
 Twice Married (1930)
 Rendezvous (1930)
 My Leopold (1931)
 Such a Greyhound (1931)
 Schubert's Dream of Spring (1931)
 Hooray, It's a Boy1 (1931)
 The Unfaithful Eckehart (1931)
 Without Meyer, No Celebration is Complete (1931)
Peace of Mind (1931)
 The Big Attraction (1931)
 The Unknown Guest (1931)
  Terror of the Garrison (1931)
 Duty Is Duty (1931)
 The Countess of Monte Cristo (1932)
 Gretel Wins First Prize (1933)
 The Sandwich Girl (1933)
 The Valiant Navigator (1935)
 The Fight with the Dragon (1935)
 The Postman from Longjumeau (1936)
 Where the Lark Sings (1936)
 The Unsuspecting Angel (1936)
 The Vagabonds (1937)
 Little County Court (1938)
 Marionette (1939)
 The Dream of Butterfly (1939)
 Love Me, Alfredo! (1940)
 The Unfaithful Eckehart (1940)
 Theodore the Goalkeeper (1950)
 Everything for the Company (1950)
 Mikosch Comes In (1952)
 The White Adventure (1952)
 The Imaginary Invalid (1952)
 Carnival in White (1952)
  Monks, Girls and Hungarian Soldiers (1952)
 Josef the Chaste (1953)
 The Night Without Morals (1953)
 Love is Forever (1954)
  The Angel with the Flaming Sword (1954)
 The Faithful Hussar (1954)
 His Daughter is Called Peter (1955)
 Love Is Just a Fairytale (1955)
 Two Bavarians in St. Pauli (1956)
 The Hunter from Roteck (1956)
 Like Once Lili Marleen (1956)
 Aunt Wanda from Uganda (1957)
 Between Munich and St. Pauli (1957)
 The Poacher of the Silver Wood (1957)
 The Schimeck Family (1957)
 Two Bavarians in the Jungle (1957)
 War of the Maidens (1957)
 Hello Taxi (1958)
 Candidates for Marriage (1958)
 When She Starts, Look Out (1958)
 Mein Schatz ist aus Tirol (1958)
 Gräfin Mariza (1958)
 Hunting Party (1959)
 Peter Voss, Hero of the Day (1959)
 Herrn Josefs letzte Liebe (1959)
 The Last Pedestrian (1960)
 Mal drunter - mal drüber (1960)
 The Hero of My Dreams (1960)
  (1960)
 Drei weiße Birken (1961)
 Festival (1961)
 Mother Holly (1961)
 Two Bavarians in Bonn (1962)
 Als ich beim Käthele im Wald war (1963)

References

External links
 
 Lucie Englisch at Virtual History

1902 births
1965 deaths
Actors from Baden bei Wien
Austrian film actresses
20th-century Austrian actresses
Austrian emigrants to Germany